Two Japanese destroyers have been named Sakaki:

 , a  launched in 1915 and stricken in 1931
 Japanese destroyer Sakaki, a  laid down in 1944 but scrapped incomplete on slip in 1945

Imperial Japanese Navy ship names
Japanese Navy ship names